Navia crispa is a plant species in the genus Navia. This species is native to Venezuela.

References

Crispa
Flora of Venezuela